was a town located in Mino District, Shimane Prefecture, Japan.

As of 2003, the town has an estimated population of 1,700 and a density of 5.67 persons per km2. The total area is 300.08 km2.

On November 1, 2004, Hikimi, along with the town of Mito (also from Mino District), was merged into the expanded city of Masuda.

Dissolved municipalities of Shimane Prefecture